Burong mangga is a Filipino side dish made by mixing sugar, salt, and water to mangoes that have previously been salted. The mixture of water and sugar should be boiled and cooled first, before pouring it over the salted mangoes. Some variants add chilis to the cooled sugar water mixture. Original "basic" burong mangga is made using a brine solution and pouring it over halved unripe or partially ripe mangoes. Mango cultivars commonly used for burong mangga include 'Carabao' mangoes and 'Pico' mangoes.

See also

Mango pickle
Kiamoy
Chanh muối 
Pickled fruit
Umeboshi

References

Plant-based fermented foods
Vegetarian dishes of the Philippines